William Lyon Benoit (born March 17, 1953) is an American scholar in the field of political communication. He graduated from Ball State University in 1975 and obtained his Master of Arts degree from Central Michigan University in 1976. He also holds a PhD from Wayne State University.

He is a distinguished professor of Communication Studies at the University of Alabama at Birmingham. He previously taught at Miami University, Bowling Green State University, the University of Missouri, and Ohio University. He was a faculty member at the University of Missouri for twenty-four years. He is known for developing image repair theory (originally called "Image Restoration") and for applying it to anecdotes in various real-world contexts. He was the editor of the Journal of Communication from 2003 to 2005, and of Communication Studies from 2007 to 2009.

Publications  

 Reading in Argumentation, Mouton Publishers (Hawthorne, NY), 1992
 Accounts, Excuses, Apologies, State University of New York Press (Albany, NY), 1995
 Candidates in Conflict, University of Alabama Press (Tuscaloosa, AL), 1996
 Campaign '96, Praeger (New York, NY), 1998
 Seeing Spots: A Functional Analysis of Presidential Television Advertisements, 1952–1996, Praeger (Westport, CN), 1999
 The Clinton Scandals and the Politics of Image Restoration, Praeger (West-port, CT), 2001
 The Primary Decision: A Functional Analysis of Debates in Presidential Primaries, Praeger (Westport, CT), 2001

References

External links
Faculty page

1953 births
Living people
Communication scholars
American political scientists
People from New Castle, Indiana
Political communication
Ball State University alumni
Central Michigan University alumni
Wayne State University alumni
University of Missouri faculty
University of Alabama at Birmingham faculty
Ohio University faculty
Miami University faculty
Bowling Green State University faculty
Academic journal editors